Cory James Brown (born 3 April 1996) is a New Zealand footballer who currently plays for Tasman United.

Career 
Brown spending time in his native New Zealand playing semi-professionally, Brown moved to the United States to play college soccer at Xavier University. Brown played four years with the Musketeers, scoring 5 goals and tallying 9 assists in 80 appearances.

Brown also appeared for USL PDL side Michigan Bucks, and NPSL side Michigan Stars.

Professional 
On 21 January 2018, Brown was selected with the 62nd overall pick of the 2018 MLS SuperDraft by Vancouver Whitecaps FC. Brown signed with Vancouver's United Soccer League affiliate Fresno FC on 20 March 2018.

References

External links 

1996 births
Living people
Association football defenders
Fresno FC players
Flint City Bucks players
New Zealand association footballers
People from Nelson, New Zealand
USL Championship players
USL League Two players
Vancouver Whitecaps FC draft picks
Xavier Musketeers men's soccer players